Eastern Suburbs Cobras, known as the Eastern Cobras, are an Australian rugby league team based in Miami, Queensland that competes in the Ipswich Rugby League Premiership. The Cobras have won the most titles in the competition having won 4 titles. The Cobras were founded in 1934 making it the second oldest club in the competition.

Squad 
Current squad:
 Brock Eldridge
 Bronson Baker
 Charles Harris
 Costner Lemafa
 Cyrus Leota
 Farran Willett
 Fred Pine
 Godfrey Okot
 Graeme Tialu
 Jarrad Lane
 Jericho Tanuvasa
 John-Paul Leota
 Lotufou Muliaga
 Lufia Hunt
 Michael Eldridge
 Pua Leautu
 Taliaamiomama Maukeni
 Timothy Konelio
 Tino Vaasa
 Tuitoga Leota
 Uritoru Vogel

Sponsors

Major Sponsors 
 Recruitment 24/7

Club Sponsors 
 Walker Pender group Lawyers
 Foodworks Supermarkets
 City to Coast Roof Restorations

References

External links
Go the Mighty Cobras

1934 establishments in Australia
Rugby clubs established in 1934
Sport in Ipswich, Queensland
Rugby league teams on the Gold Coast, Queensland